Quad Cities Generating Station is a two-unit nuclear power plant located near Cordova, Illinois, United States, on the Mississippi River.  The two General Electric boiling water reactors give the plant a total gross electric capacity of approximately 1,880 MW.  It was named for the nearby cities of Moline, Illinois, Rock Island, Illinois, Davenport, Iowa, East Moline, Illinois, and Bettendorf, Iowa — known as the Quad Cities.

The Quad Cities plant is owned and operated by Constellation Energy.
In 2004, the U.S. Nuclear Regulatory Commission (NRC) approved a 20-year license extension for both reactors at this plant.  Citing the plant's ongoing string of financial losses, Exelon had considered shutting down the facility by 2018.

On June 2, 2016, Exelon announced its intentions to close Quad Cities Nuclear Generating Station on June 1, 2018 due to the plant's profitability and a lack of support from the Illinois state legislature.

On December 14, 2016, Exelon announced it would keep Quad Cities Nuclear Generating station open due to Illinois passing the Future Energy Jobs Bill.

Electricity Generation

Extended power uprate

During an extended power uprate test on March 5, 2002 (designed to extend the power efficiency of existing BWR reactors), Quad Cities Unit 2 began to experience vibrations in a steam line. On March 29 the plant was manually shut down due to high vibrations causing leaks in the main turbine control system. Unit 2 was restarted on April 2, but vibration broke a main steam pipe drain line. The line was repaired and the restart resumed, but by June 7 the main steam lines were showing unexplained aberrations.  The plant was again taken offline for repairs on July 11, and the problem was traced to a hole in the steam dryer.  The steam dryer was repaired and Unit 2 was restarted on July 21, 2002. The incident did not result in any increased probability of an accident.  The NRC inspected all repairs and the extended power uprate was completed successfully.

2015 net generation was 15.5 million MWh, and the capacity factor was 95.0%. This equates to roughly 1.2 million homes.

Surrounding population

The 2010 U.S. population within  of Quad Cities was 34,350, a decrease of 0.5 percent in a decade, according to an analysis of U.S. Census data for msnbc.com. The 2010 U.S. population within  was 655,207, a decrease of 0.3 percent since 2000. Cities within 50 miles include Davenport and Moline (19 miles to city center).

Exelon's cost disclosure
In 2015, Exelon's executive vice president stated that its five Illinois dual-unit power plants have costs roughly $33/MW·h to $34/MW·h of electricity produced and that its Clinton single-unit power plant costs roughly $38/MW·h to $39/MW·h. These costs consist of labor, scheduled and outages maintenance (including provisions for unanticipated outages), nuclear fuel, capital spending, corporate costs (like legal and human resources), and the property taxes paid to host communities.

On the other side, revenues come from the energy prices paid by utility customers and businesses and capacity charges covered by all consumers. For 2016 and 2017 energy prices were set in 2015 around $30.50/MW·h (about $33/MW·h in 2014).  The August 21, 2015, announced capacity price, set via an auction conducted yearly by PJM Interconnection (the power-grid administrator covering northern Illinois), for the year beginning June 1, 2018, was $215 per megawatt-day, which, divided for 24 hours, translates to $8.96/MW·h. Adding those revenues yields slightly less than $39.50/MW·h, beginning in mid-2018.

In that auction, Quad Cities did not qualify for the capacity charges, having bid too high, so it will get only the energy price, $30.50/MW·h.

More, each power plant has to pay congestion costs, to move its energy on the power grid. Some plants have around $1/MW·h to $2,50/MW·h of such costs. Quad Cities is projected to pay $9.60/MW·h in 2015. Putting all together, Exelon expected to get revenue around $22.50/MW·h in 2017, so Quad Cities would lose $11/MW·h. Given an annual generation of 15.44 million MW·h, it sums to $170 million of losses.

But Quad Cities could be relieved of some of the congestion costs in 2017. Grand Prairie Gateway, a new transmission line, is under construction by Commonwealth Edison, the largest Illinois electric utility. Once completed, it will relieve power-grid congestion for both Quad Cities and Byron, another Exelon power plant. Taking away congestion costs, Quad Cities losses may be reduced to around $70 million in 2017.

In 2016, Exelon distributed charts showing its nuclear plants earning revenue of $19,40/MW·h from Quad Cities to $27,80/MW·h from Dresden. Other values shown were: Braidwood $26.1, Byron $22.2, La Salle $26.5 and Clinton $22.6.

In 2016, Exelon also got a $5.60/MW·h additional revenue following agreements for high-demand periods delivery and in investor presentations, Exelon stated that about 90% of 2016 revenues are locked at more than $34/MW·h. Summing all together, it appears that almost all Exelon power plants, except Clinton, would break-even at $35/MW·h.

In December 2016, Illinois voted to subsidize Exelon with 1c/kWh or $235 million per year (depending on electricity rates) to keep QC and Clinton open for at least 10 years, as natural gas had decreased rates.

Seismic risk
The Nuclear Regulatory Commission's estimate of the risk each year of an earthquake intense enough to cause core damage to the reactor at Quad Cities was 1 in 37,037, according to an NRC study published in August 2010.

References

External links

Exelon Corporation Quad Cities Plant Page

NukeWorker

Energy infrastructure completed in 1973
Nuclear power plants in Illinois
Buildings and structures in Rock Island County, Illinois
Quad Cities
Nuclear power stations using boiling water reactors
Exelon
1973 establishments in Illinois